Kuvikal Point (‘Nos Kuvikal’ \'nos 'ku-vi-k&l\) is the point on the east side of the entrance to Transmarisca Bay and the west side of the entrance to Suregetes Cove on the north coast of Krogh Island in Biscoe Islands, Antarctica.

The point is named after Kuvikal Peak in the Rhodope Mountains, Bulgaria.

Location
It first appeared in British mapping in 1976.

Maps
 British Antarctic Territory.  Scale 1:200000 topographic map.  DOS 610 Series, Sheet W 66 66.  Directorate of Overseas Surveys, UK, 1976.
 Antarctic Digital Database (ADD). Scale 1:250000 topographic map of Antarctica. Scientific Committee on Antarctic Research (SCAR). Since 1993, regularly upgraded and updated.

Notes

References
 Bulgarian Antarctic Gazetteer. Antarctic Place-names Commission. (details in Bulgarian, basic data in English)
 Kuvikal Point. SCAR Composite Antarctic Gazetteer.

External links
 Kuvikal Point. Copernix satellite image

Headlands of the Biscoe Islands
Bulgaria and the Antarctic